The 2021 Ag-Pro 300 was a NASCAR Xfinity Series race held on April 24, 2021. It was contested over 90 laps—shortened from 113 laps due to rain—on the  superspeedway. It was the eight race of the 2021 NASCAR Xfinity Series season. Kaulig Racing driver Jeb Burton, collected his career Xfinity series win.

Report

Background
Talladega Superspeedway, formerly known as Alabama International Motor Speedway, is a motorsports complex located north of Talladega, Alabama in Lincoln, Alabama. It is located on the former Anniston Air Force Base in the small city of Lincoln. A tri-oval, the track was constructed in 1969 by the International Speedway Corporation, a business controlled by the France family. Talladega is most known for its steep banking. The track currently hosts NASCAR's Cup Series, Xfinity Series and Camping World Truck Series. Talladega is the longest NASCAR oval with a length of 2.66-mile-long (4.28 km) tri-oval like the Daytona International Speedway, which is 2.5-mile-long (4.0 km).

Entry list 
 (R) denotes rookie driver.
 (i) denotes driver who is ineligible for series driver points.

Qualifying
Austin Cindric was awarded the pole for the race as determined by competition-based formula. Jordan Anderson, Ronnie Bassett Jr., and Andy Lally did not have enough points to qualify for the race.

Starting Lineups

Race

Race results

Stage Results 
Stage One
Laps: 25

Stage Two
Laps: 25

Final Stage Results 

Laps: 22

Race statistics 
 Lead changes: 22 among 12 different drivers
 Cautions/Laps: 4 for 15
 Time of race: 1 hour, 43 minutes, and 13 seconds
 Average speed:

References 

NASCAR races at Talladega Superspeedway
2021 in sports in Alabama
April 2021 sports events in the United States
2021 NASCAR Xfinity Series